Brigitte Belton is a Canadian truck driver who started the Canada convoy protest.

Career and activism 
Belton is a truck driver. On 16 November 2021 Canadian Border Services Agency officers refused Belton entry to Canada at the Detroit-Windor due to her failure to wear a face mask. At the October 2022 Public Order Emergency Commission, commission lawyer Stephen Armstrong stated that Belton vented her frustration via her TikTok feed before using the platform to connect with Chris Barber and then later initiating the planning of the Canada convoy protest. Armstrong said that Belton, Chris Barber, and James Bauder all took part in a Facebook Live event on January 13, 2022 to plan the protest's route and logistics. The next day, Tamara Lich started the fundraiser for the protest.

Belton was one of the first witnesses to testify at the Public Order Emergency Commission in October 2022. During her testimony she questioned how fellow protest leader Tamara Lich would spend money raised to support the convoy protest, and was critical of a decision to buy a decommissioned church in Ottawa. In July 2022, Belton's social media connected Tamara Lich to the pending purchase of Saint Brigid's Church in Ottawa, which was being occupied by The United People of Canada.

In May 2022, Belton was selected as the Ontario Party's candidate for the Elgin-Middlesex-London riding. She won 234 votes, representing 2.6% of the votes cast, losing to Rob Flack.

Personal life 
Belton is from Wallaceburg, Ontario. She is not vaccinated for COVID-19.

She is married, and is both a mother and a grandmother.

See also 

 Pat King
 Timeline of the Canada convoy protest

References 

Year of birth missing (living people)
Living people
Canadian anti-vaccination activists
Canadian truck drivers
Protesters involved in the Canada convoy protest